David After Dentist is an Internet phenomenon which started when David DeVore Jr.'s father posted a video on the Internet of his reaction to anesthesia after he had been given oral surgery. , it has been viewed 141 million times on YouTube.

Video origins and publication 
In May 2008, 7-year-old David DeVore Jr. was taken to the dentist to have an extra tooth removed, due to a hereditary condition called hyperdontia. Because this was David's first surgery and his mother could not be there, his father decided to videotape the experience to share with her and their family.

After the surgery, David was feeling confused from the anaesthesia he was given.  While in the car, he was asking his father questions like "Is this real life?" and "Is this going to be forever?" and also telling him that he had two fingers. At one point, he famously attempted to push himself up from his seat (while still buckled in) and began screaming before sinking back in exhaustion.

Seven months later, David's father uploaded the video on Facebook. Being overwhelmed with people wanting to see the video, he decided to upload it to YouTube, but did not notice there was a private option. Just 3 days after the upload, it had been seen over 3 million times.
 
The DeVore family were soon made YouTube Partners. This gives YouTube the right to run ads over the videos they post, and in exchange, are given a share of the revenue. They also sell "David After Dentist" T-shirts and donate a portion of the revenue they earn to dental charities.

In May 2021, the DeVore family created an auction for a "David After Dentist" NFT, with the profits going toward David and his brother's college tuitions. The NFT sold for around $13,500.

In the media 
The DeVore family appeared on the Today Show, Tyra Banks Show and The O'Reilly Factor to discuss the video.
"David After Dentist" was referenced on My Name is Earl in May 2009.
It was included in a question on the UK's The Big Fat Quiz of the Year 2009 for Channel Four.
In January 2010, the DeVores appeared on the season 2 premier of Tosh.0.
In episode 19 of the 1st season of The Cleveland Show, the 5 year old character Rallo says "What's happening? Is this real life? Is this gonna be forever?" referring to the video
Tv Spain El Hormiguero, which aired on April 27, 2010.
As part of a series parodying viral videos, The Annoying Orange web series featured a parody of "David After Dentist" as its first parody. The main plot difference is that Orange has gotten his teeth whitened instead of having had a tooth removed.
The video is referenced in an episode of Good Luck Charlie, when PJ, having been given anesthesia at the dentist's office, sits in the lobby acting loopy and saying, among other confused statements, "Is this real life?".
A red shirted version of David has a brief animated cameo in Regular Show episode "Go Viral".
During a skit 'Dancing with Internet Stars' So Random made a reference to David After Dentist with actor Doug Brochu pretending to be him and acting as he did in the video making similar comments.
Comedic actor Brandon Hardesty created a parody where he played the part of David, but acted in a serious manner as though he were in a drama.
On The Simpsons episode "A Tree Grows in Springfield", when Homer sees his broken Mypad, Homer says he wanted to "see the kid knocked up on dentist gas". Then the video plays for a second before the Mypad then breaks.
The video is mentioned in the show New Girl, in the fourth episode of season 1, which aired November 2011. The character Winston is catching up on the two years of American history he missed while living in Latvia. It is the last video he has to watch along with The King's Speech, The Human Centipede and Precious.
 The Pocket God episode Dance Dance Execution when the pygmies blow on the balloons they sound like David went to the dentist.

Criticism 
David DeVore Sr. has received criticism for exploiting his son. DeVore has stated that he appreciates the concern, but feels that it was innocent and has been a very positive experience for his family.

Medical explanation 
In the video, David states that he sees four fingers when looking at his two pointer fingers. He later adds, "I don't see anything", after which he tells his father: "you have four eyes". David may have been experiencing blurred and double vision, which are common side-effects of dental anaesthesia. In the medical literature, several ocular complications such as diplopia (blurred and double vision) and dizziness have been reported as a consequence of improperly administered local intraoral anaesthesia. It is estimated that ophthalmologic complications occur in approximately 1 in 1,000 local intraoral anesthetic injections; the majority of documented symptomatic responses arise within 5 minutes and may last for several minutes to hours.

References

External links

Viral videos
2009 YouTube videos
Internet memes introduced in 2009